The surname Scherman may refer to:

David Scherman
Jan Scherman
Fred Scherman, American baseball player
Harry Scherman, American publisher and economist
Karl Gustaf Scherman, Swedish economist and government official
Katharine Scherman 
Leo Scherman
Lucian Scherman
Nosson Scherman, American Haredi rabbi  
Rowland Scherman 
Tony Scherman

See also
Sherman (name)

Jewish surnames